Memoirs of the Twentieth Century is an early work of speculative fiction by Irish writer Samuel Madden. This 1733 epistolary novel takes the form of a series of diplomatic letters written in 1997 and 1998. The work is a satire perhaps modeled after Jonathan Swift's Gulliver's Travels published seven years before. Madden was an Anglican clergyman, and the book is focused on the dangers of Catholicism and Jesuits, depicting a future where they dominate.

Soon after the book was published anonymously, Madden had most copies destroyed. Although this would mean the book had little influence in its own time (with a negligible contemporary readership and no real impact on later writers), the book is notable as an early work to feature time travel. In his 1987 work Origins of Futuristic Fiction, Paul Alkon describes the book as the earliest in English literature to feature time travel, but notes that it does not explain how it was performed. In the 2008 book Physics of the Impossible, Michio Kaku also describes the work as arguably the first account of time travel in fiction.

Plot
The book is a series of letters from British representatives in the foreign cities of Constantinople, Rome, Paris, and Moscow and a smaller number of letters returned to them from the UK. The representatives address their letters to a Lord High Treasurer who is in service of King George VI. The technology of the 20th century is unchanged from Madden's own era; the focus is instead on the political and religious state of the world in the future.

In Madden's future history, much of the world has come to be dominated by the Jesuits. In the early 19th century, Jesuit Paul IX became pope and seized temporal control over most of Italy. The eighteenth century had been one of war between Spain, France, and the Holy Roman Empire, but weakened by conflict and mismanagement all three powers became vassals to the Pontiff by the mid-nineteenth century. Also under papal control are vast estates in Africa, China, and Paraguay.

In France, King Louis XIX reigns but the French state is weak and he is controlled by his Jesuit prime minister. In Constantinople, the Ottoman Empire has fallen and been replaced by a Tatar one. The new regime pursued a liberal religious policy, and by 1997 Deism and Christianity had come to dominate, with Jesuit missionaries active and powerful. Russia is an expansionist power, having annexed Finland, Poland, and parts of Persia and Turkey; while traditionally a foe of the Jesuits the late 20th century sees them growing in power there as well.

References

External links
Google Books copy

1733 novels
1730s science fiction novels
Irish science fiction novels
Fiction set in 1997
Fiction set in 1998
Political satire books
Irish satirical novels
Works published anonymously
Future history